Hoài Thượng is a commune (xã) in Thuận Thành District, Bắc Ninh Province, in northeastern Vietnam. It has a population of just over 9,000.

References

Populated places in Bắc Ninh province